The 1965 United States Road Racing Championship season was the third season of the Sports Car Club of America's United States Road Racing Championship. It began April 11, 1965, and ended September 5, 1965, after nine races.  Separate races for sportscars and GTs were held at two rounds, while seven rounds were combined races.  George Follmer won the season championship driving in the Under-2 Liter class.

Schedule

Season results
Overall winner in bold.

External links
World Sports Racing Prototypes: USRRC 1965
World Sports Racing Prototypes: USRRC GT 1965
Racing Sports Cars: USRRC archive

United States Road Racing Championship
United States Road Racing Championship